James Albert "Jack" Helme (born 1897) was an English footballer who played in the Football League for Stoke.

Career
Helme was born in Altrincham and played for his local team in the Cheshire County League. He impressed enough with "Alty" to earn a move to Football League side Stoke for the 1920–21 season. He played four matches for Stoke scoring once against Barnsley in a 3–2 victory on 2 May 1921. At the end of the season he rejoined Altrincham.

Career statistics

References

English footballers
Altrincham F.C. players
Stoke City F.C. players
English Football League players
1897 births
Year of death missing
Association football inside forwards